Lisa Jahn (born 25 February 1994) is a German sprint canoer. 

She qualified at the 2020 Summer Olympics, in the C-1 200 meters, and C-2 500 meters. 

She competed at the 2018 ICF Canoe Sprint World Championships, and at the 2021 Canoe Sprint World Cup.

References

External links 
 Lisa Jahn Kanu Fotos | IMAGO (imago-images.de)
 

German female canoeists
Living people
1994 births
Canoeists at the 2020 Summer Olympics
Olympic canoeists of Germany
Canoeists at the 2019 European Games
European Games medalists in canoeing
European Games silver medalists for Germany
21st-century German women